Ishtvan Jorovich Sandor (born 19 August 1944) is a Ukrainian former football player and coach of Hungarian origin. He was awarded the honorary title of the Master of Sports of the USSR.

Biography 
He started playing football in his youth in his native Zakarpattia Oblast. In 1966 he was invited to the “Polissya” team (Zhytomyr). In 1970 he played for Spartak, Sumy for a short time. After the end of his professional career as a football player, he was appointed as a coach of Hoverla (Uzhhorod), which then played in the second league of the USSR Football Championship (197? -1978).

Halso became an assistant of the second league team Spartak (Ivano-Frankivsk) in 1979. In 1981 he was the head coach of Spartak, which was then called "Prykarpattia" and played in the first league, served on the teams of Bukovina (Chernivsky) (1982–1983), Zakarpattia (Uzhgorod) (1984–1987) and Zirka (Kirovograd) (1988–1989).

After settling in Hungary, he was the coach of Nyíregyháza, Diósgyőr and then Stadler. He became a MTK player observer in 1998. He led the BVSC team in the second half of the year. He has been leading the Csongrád team since the summer of 1999. He held this position until June 2001, when he became the coach of Nyíregyháza again.

References

External links 
 1970. Класс «А». Вторая группа. 1 зона. (in Russian)
 Кубок СССР 1981 год. (in Russian)

1944 births
Living people
Soviet footballers
Ukrainian footballers
Association football midfielders
FC Hoverla Uzhhorod managers
FC Spartak Ivano-Frankivsk managers
FC Zirka Kropyvnytskyi managers
FC Polissya Zhytomyr players
FC Spartak Sumy players
Soviet football managers
Ukrainian football managers
Diósgyőri VTK managers
Ukrainian expatriate football managers
Expatriate football managers in Hungary
Ukrainian expatriate sportspeople in Hungary